Fidelman may refer to :

Greg Fidelman (born September 4, 1977) is an American engineer for Roadrunner Records
Pictures of Fidelman is a short story collection by Bernard Malamud.